Viva Vigilante! is the sixth studio album by English gothic rock band Sex Gang Children. It was released in September 2013 by record label Pale Music.

The album was self-described as a "dark baroquial tapestry tinged with glam".

Track listing
All tracks composed by Andi Sex Gang
"Hollywood Slim"
"Religion Free Zone"
"Conversation"
"Salamun Child"
"The Messenger"
"Bleed England"
"Sunset of Crow"
"All American Heart"
"Genocide Trend"
"Death Squad Diva"
"Die Traube"
"Urania"
"Pigs to Men"

Digital distribution exclusives
"Criminal Tango" (Dub Version)
"Sunset of Crow" (Remix)
"Bleed England" (Demo)

Personnel
Andi Sex Gang - vocals
Adrian Portas, Matthew James Saw - guitar
Cam Campbell, Carl Magnusson - bass
Kevin Matthews - drums

Album cover
The album cover was shot by Welsh photographer Bari Goddard and featured Thomas-James Fisher.

Tour
Sex Gang Children announced a 30th anniversary show at The Garage in London on 2 May 2014.
 In December 2013, the band announced two concert dates in Japan on 14 and 15 January 2014.

References

2013 albums
Sex Gang Children albums